Eckhart may be:

People with the surname Eckhart
 Aaron Eckhart, American film actor
 Dietrich Eckart, German journalist
 Johann Georg von Eckhart, German historian and linguist
 Lisa Eckhart (born 1992), Austrian comedian and slam poet

Other
 Eckhart Tolle (born 1948) is a German-born writer and public speaker living in Canada.
 Eckhart von Hochheim, aka Meister Eckhart, a German theologian and philosopher
 Mason Eckhart, a comic book character
 Eckhart (TV series), a Canadian animated children's show
 Eckhart Branch Railroad, early short line railroad

See also
 Eckart
 Eckert (disambiguation)